tert-Butyl hydroperoxide (tBuOOH) is the organic compound with the formula (CH3)3COOH. It is one of the most widely used hydroperoxides in a variety of oxidation processes, for example the Halcon process.  It is normally supplied as a 69–70% aqueous solution.  Compared to hydrogen peroxide and organic peracids, tert-butyl hydroperoxide is less reactive and more soluble in organic solvents. Overall, it is renowned for the convenient handling properties of its solutions. Its solutions in organic solvents are highly stable.

Application
Industrially, tert-butyl hydroperoxide is used to prepare propylene oxide.  In the Halcon process, molybdenum-based catalysts are used for this reaction:
(CH3)3COOH  +  CH2=CHCH3  → (CH3)3COH  +  CH2OCHCH3 
The byproduct t-butanol, which can be dehydrated to isobutene and converted to MTBE.

On a much smaller scale, tert-butyl hydroperoxide is used to produce some fine chemicals by the Sharpless epoxidation.

Synthesis and production 
Many synthetic routes are available, e.g. by the auto-oxidation of isobutane.

Safety
tert-butyl hydroperoxide is potentially dangerous, but explosions are rare.

A solution of tert-butyl hydroperoxide and water with a concentration of greater than 90% is forbidden to be shipped according to US Department of Transportation Hazardous Materials Table 49 CFR 172.101.

In some sources it also has an NFPA 704 rating of 4 for health, 4 for flammability, 4 for reactivity and is a potent oxidant, however other sources claim lower ratings of 3-2-2 or 1-4-4.

See also
Di-tert-butyl peroxide

References

Hydroperoxides
Reagents for organic chemistry
Tert-butyl compounds
Oxidizing agents